Visitors is a 2013 American documentary film, written and directed by Godfrey Reggio.

Summary
It explores (like his previous films) "humanity's trancelike relationship with technology."

Music
The musical score for Visitors was composed by Philip Glass, who previously collaborated with director Godfrey Reggio on the Qatsi trilogy. Performed by the Bruckner Orchestra Linz and conducted by Dennis Russell Davies, the music was released as a soundtrack album by Orange Mountain Music on September 3, 2013.

Release
It was screened in the Special Presentation section at the 2013 Toronto International Film Festival.

Reception

References

External links
 
 

2013 films
2013 documentary films
American documentary films
Films without speech
Films directed by Godfrey Reggio
Documentary films about technology
Face
Non-narrative films
2010s American films